Carl A. Morris (May 12, 1911 – June 3, 1993) was an American painter, born in Yorba Linda, California. Morris studied at the Chicago Art Institute and in Paris and Vienna. He opened the Spokane Art Center through the Federal Art Project during the Great Depression. Morris met his wife, sculptor Hilda Grossman, when he recruited her as a teacher for the center. Moving to Seattle in 1940, they met Mark Tobey and became lifelong friends.

In 1941, he was commissioned by the Treasury Section of Fine Arts to paint murals for the post office in Eugene, Oregon. The Morrises settled in Portland, Oregon, and established their artistic careers, beginning as figurative artists and gradually moving toward abstract art. They often visited New York to see friends such as Mark Rothko, Robert Motherwell, Joseph Campbell and Lionel Trilling but declined to relocate, wanting to avoid what they saw as a climate of commercialism and artistic distraction. Morris is known today for his strong Abstract Impressionist paintings.

His work can be seen in collections throughout the U.S., including those of the Portland Art Museum, the Tacoma Art Museum, the Jordan Schnitzer Museum of Art, the Vollum Institute, Reed College, the Boise Art Museum, the Denver Art Museum, The Metropolitan Museum of Art, and the San Francisco Museum of Modern Art. During his life, his work was shown at the Whitney Museum of American Art and the Guggenheim Museum in New York City, the Art Institute of Chicago and the Seattle Art Museum.

References

External links

1911 births
1993 deaths
20th-century American painters
American male painters
American people of Welsh descent
Artists from Oregon
Culture of Eugene, Oregon
Northwest School (art)
Pacific Northwest artists
Painters from California
Artists from Spokane, Washington
People from Yorba Linda, California
School of the Art Institute of Chicago alumni
Federal Art Project administrators
Section of Painting and Sculpture artists
American expatriates in France
American expatriates in Austria
20th-century American male artists